The 1990 United States Senate election in Tennessee was held on November 6, 1990, to select the U.S. Senator from the state of Tennessee. Democratic U.S. Senator Al Gore won re-election to a second term in a landslide, sweeping every county in the state.

Candidates

Democratic Party 
 Al Gore, incumbent U.S. Senator

Democratic

Republican Party 
 William R. Hawkins, conservative author

Election results

See also 
 1990 United States Senate elections

References 

1990 Tennessee elections
Tennessee
1990
Al Gore